There are at least 20 named lakes and reservoirs in Poinsett County, Arkansas.

Lakes
Dead Timber Lake, el.  
Hood Lake, el.  
Lost Trap Lake, el.  
 Snake Slough, el.  
 Spear Lake, el.

Reservoirs
Chase Reservoir, el.  
Claypool Reservoir, el.  
John Kocher Lake, el.  
Keller Lake, el.  
Lake Hogue, el.  
Lake Poinsett, el.  
Lonnie Jaynes Lake, el.  
O K Lake, el.  
Paul Senteny Lake, el.  
Poinsett Watershed Site 101 Reservoir, el.  
Poinsett Watershed Site 102 Reservoir, el.  
Poinsett Watershed Site One Reservoir, el.  
Poinsett Watershed Site Three Reservoir, el.  
Poinsett Watershed Site Two Reservoir, el.  
Wayne Carter Lake, el.

See also
 List of lakes in Arkansas

Notes

Bodies of water of Poinsett County, Arkansas
Poinsett